Lake County is a county in the U.S. state of Ohio. As of the 2020 census, the population was 232,603. The county seat is Painesville. The county was established on March 6, 1840, from land given by Cuyahoga and Geauga Counties. Its name is derived from its location on the southern shore of Lake Erie. Lake County is part of the Cleveland-Elyria, OH Metropolitan Statistical Area.

History
The land that became Lake County was home to the indigenous Erie people prior to the arrival of the French in the region during the early 1600s, and considered by the French to be part of their Colony of New France. Ceded to Great Britain in 1763, the area became part of the Province of Quebec through the Quebec Act of 1774. Following the American Revolutionary War, it became part of the Connecticut Western Reserve in the Northwest Territory, then was purchased by the Connecticut Land Company in 1795. It was separated out of Geauga County in 1808.

Geography
It is Ohio's smallest county by land area but the third-largest by total area. It borders Ontario across Lake Erie.

Adjacent counties
 Ashtabula County (east)
 Geauga County (south)
 Cuyahoga County (south and west)

Major highways

National protected area
 James A. Garfield National Historic Site

Physical geography
Ridges on the Lake Plain physiographic region, and on which some roads are laid, are beaches formed by the various glacial lakes which occurred as the glaciers receded. Lake Maumee was the highest glacial lake at about 760 feet, and left Maumee II beach. Whittlesey beach, formed by Lake Whittlesey at 740 feet, is known as South Ridge. Arkona beach (Lake Arkona) is Middle Ridge, and occurs at about 690 feet. North Ridge is the remnant of Warren beach (Lake Warren), at an elevation of 685 feet. Elkton beach is the northernmost ridge, at 625 feet, an occurred at the time of Lake Elkton. Lake Shore Boulevard follows Elkton beach in Mentor Township.

Mentor Marsh is an Ohio State Nature Preserve. Mentor Marsh is an abandoned channel of the Grand River.

Demographics

In 2010, 92.4% spoke English, 2.7% Spanish, and 1.4% Croatian.

2000 census
As of the census of 2000, the county had 227,511 people, 89,700 households, and 62,520 families. The population density was 997 people per square mile (385/km2). There were 93,487 housing units at an average density of 410 per square mile (158/km2). The county's racial makeup was 95.40% White, 1.99% Black or African American, 0.11% Native American, 0.90% Asian, 0.02% Pacific Islander, 0.66% from other races, and 0.92% from two or more races. 1.70% of the population were Hispanic or Latino of any race. 18.5% were of German, 14.6% Italian, 12.7% Irish, 8.1% English, 6.2% Polish, 5.7% American and 5.4% Slovene ancestry. 93.6% spoke English, 1.9% Spanish, and 0.8% Croatian as their first language.

There were 89,700 households, out of which 31.10% had children under the age of 18 living with them, 56.10% were married couples living together, 10.00% had a female householder with no husband present, and 30.30% were non-families. 25.60% of all households were made up of individuals, and 9.80% had someone living alone who was 65 years of age or older. The average household size was 2.50 and the average family size was 3.03.

The county's population was spread out, with 24.20% under the age of 18, 7.30% from 18 to 24, 29.70% from 25 to 44, 24.70% from 45 to 64, and 14.10% who were 65 years of age or older. The median age was 39 years. For every 100 females there were 94.50 males. For every 100 females age 18 and over, there were 91.50 males.

The county's median household income was $48,763, and the median family income was $57,134. Males had a median income of $40,916 versus $28,434 for females. The county's per capita income was $23,160. About 3.50% of families and 5.10% of the population were below the poverty line, including 6.50% of those under age 18 and 5.40% of those age 65 or over.

2010 census
As of the 2010 census, there were 230,041 people, 94,156 households, and 62,384 families residing in the county. The racial makeup of the county was 92.5% white, 3.2% black or African American, 1.1% Asian, 0.1% American Indian, 1.6% from other races, and 1.5% from two or more races. Those of Hispanic or Latino origin made up 3.4% of the population. In terms of ancestry, 26.4% were German, 18.9% were Irish, 16.4% were Italian, 11.5% were English, 7.6% were Polish, 5.4% were Hungarian, and 3.9% were American.

Of the 94,156 households, 29.4% had children under the age of 18 living with them, 50.5% were married couples living together, 11.2% had a female householder with no husband present, 33.7% were non-families, and 28.3% of all households were made up of individuals. The average household size was 2.41 and the average family size was 2.97. The median age was 42.3 years.

The median income for a household in the county was $54,896 and the median income for a family was $67,206. Males had a median income of $49,240 versus $36,906 for females. The per capita income for the county was $28,221. About 6.0% of families and 8.1% of the population were below the poverty line, including 13.0% of those under age 18 and 4.4% of those age 65 or over.

Private/Independent Schools
Hershey Montessori School is an independent Montessori school located in Concord Township in Lake County. It serves students from two months old through sixth grade. Its seventh through twelfth-grade campus is located in nearby Huntsburg, Ohio.

Environment

Scorecard report from 2002 ranks Lake County among the worst 10% of counties in the U.S. in terms of cancer risk, developmental and reproductive toxicants, and other categories as well; this is comparable with most major cities and densely populated areas. Scorecard In 2004, this county ranked among the cleanest/best 10% of all counties in the U.S. in terms of the number of designated Superfund sites.

Lake County has a large public park system, including Lake Metroparks Farmpark. Kirtland is home to the Holden Arboretum and Gildersleeve Mountain. Headlands Beach State Park is in Mentor. The Grand River is a state wild and scenic river and the Chagrin River is a state scenic river.

Transportation

Laketran is the transit agency servicing Lake County. Interstate 90 runs northeast–southwest through Lake County, roughly parallel to State Route 2; along with the north–south State Route 44 connecting the two together. These freeways make up the major traffic arteries in the county. Lake County does not have passenger rail service, though Amtrak's New York City-Chicago "Lake Shore Limited" service schedules an eastbound and westbound train through Lake County nightly with stops at Cleveland and Erie. CSXT (former Conrail, née-Penn Central, née-New York Central) and Norfolk Southern (née-Norfolk & Western, née-Nickel Plate Road) provide railroad main line through-freight service. The recently formed Grand River Railroad, operating on former Baltimore & Ohio track, serves the Fairport Harbor area linking the Morton Salt plant with CSXT at Painesville.

Library services
The following libraries serve Lake County:
 Fairport Harbor Public Library in Fairport Harbor
 Kirtland Public Library in Kirtland
 Madison Public Library in Madison
 Mentor Public Library in Mentor
 Morley Library in Painesville
 Perry Public Library in Perry
 Wickliffe Public Library in Wickliffe. WKPL is "A Top Ten American Library" as rated by the HAPLR Index.  In 2005, the library loaned more than 459,000 items to its 110,400 cardholders. Total holdings are over 100,000 volumes with over 519 periodical subscriptions.
 Willoughby-Eastlake Public Library, headquartered in Eastlake with branches in Eastlake, Willoughby, Willoughby Hills, and Willowick. In 2005, the library loaned more than 1.2 million items to its 37,000 cardholders. Total holding are over 216,000 volumes with over 850 periodical subscriptions.
Additionally, as of 2019, all Lake County libraries are all CLEVNET members.

Politics
Lake County is known as a "purple" or "swing" county within the state. A 2008 analysis of Ohio presidential election results from 1960 to 2004 found no other county more closely follows the statewide Ohio voting pattern. Lake County doesn't always vote with the winner, but consistently is closer to the winner's Ohio vote percentage than any other Ohio county.

|}

Communities

Cities

 Eastlake
 Kirtland
 Mentor
 Mentor-on-the-Lake
 Painesville (county seat)
 Wickliffe
 Willoughby
 Willoughby Hills
 Willowick

Villages

 Fairport Harbor
 Grand River
 Kirtland Hills
 Lakeline
 Madison
 North Perry
 Perry
 Timberlake
 Waite Hill

Townships
 Concord
 Leroy
 Madison
 Painesville
 Perry

Census-designated place
 North Madison

Unincorporated communities
 Painesville-on-the-Lake
 Unionville

See also
 Melon heads - a local urban legend
 National Register of Historic Places listings in Lake County, Ohio
 Historic Country Estates in Lake County, Ohio

References

External links

 
 Willoughby-Eastlake Public Library website

 
1840 establishments in Ohio
Ohio counties in the Western Reserve